Cryptosporangium aurantiacum is a bacterium.

References

Further reading
Sneath, Peter HA, et al. Bergey's manual of systematic bacteriology. Volume 5. Williams & Wilkins, 2012.

External links

Type strain of Cryptosporangium aurantiacum at BacDive -  the Bacterial Diversity Metadatabase

Actinomycetia
Bacteria described in 2001